Miss India Worldwide 1991 was the second edition of the international female beauty pageant. The total number of contestants was not known. Bela Bajaria of the United States crowned as winner at the end of the event.

Results

Delegates

 – Kamal Sidhu
 – Shalini Singh
 – Sandra Singh
 – Ritu Singh
 – Ronit Yehskiel
 – Anastasia Ramlall
 – Asha Bhoelai
 – Suriakava Manikam
 – Gerelene Jagganath
 – Smita Bansal
 – Anupama Jaidka
 – Bela Bajaria

References

External links
Official website

1991 beauty pageants